Skytone are a Canadian duo from Ottawa consisting of brothers Rodney and Darius Doddridge. Their sound is generally considered jangle, indie pop with Rodney and Darius singing and playing all instruments on their albums. 
Recording and mixing is done at their home studio and albums are produced by Rodney.

All album releases are on the Ottawa-based label The Beautiful Music.

Skytone discography
2022 Adrift 
2018 This is Gonna Get Real! 
2017 JangleWaves 
2015 Live @ the Fishfry
2010 Shining Over You
2006 Echoes In All Directions

References

External links
 skytone tumblr 
 bandcamp 
 Skytone YouTube channel
 Spotify

Musical groups established in 2003
Musical groups from Ottawa
Canadian indie pop groups
2003 establishments in Ontario